Elan Gale (born October 27, 1983) is an American author, television writer, and television producer. He worked on the reality series The Bachelor and created FBOY Island. Gale also produced The Bachelorette, Bachelor Pad, Bachelor in Paradise and High School Reunion.

Early life 
Gale was born in Los Angeles County, California.

Bibliography 
 It's Never Too Late To Go Back To Bed (calendar)
 You're Not That Great (but neither is anyone else) (2017)

Filmography

Producer 
 The Midnight Club - co-producer, writer (2022)
 The One That Got Away - executive producer (showrunner) (2022) 
 Midnight Mass - consulting producer, writer (2021)
 FBOY Island - TV series, creator, executive producer (2021-22)
 The Bachelor - TV series, executive producer (2010–19)
 The Bachelorette - TV series, executive producer (2009–18)
 Bachelor in Paradise - TV series, executive producer (2014-2018)
 Bachelor Pad - TV series, senior producer (2010-2012)
 Looking for Lenny - Documentary, producer (2011)
 High School Reunion - TV series, field producer (2010)
 The Cougar - TV series, segment producer (2009)
 Coolio's Rules - TV series, consulting producer (2008)
 Cookin' with Coolio - TV series, producer (2008)
 Tomorrow's Yesterday - short, executive producer (2006)

Actor 
 Uncredited appearance in Guardians of the Galaxy Vol. 2 (2017)
 Appears in an episode of The Haunting of Hill House on Netflix (2018)

Director 
 Looking for Lenny - Director and producer (2011), a documentary about Lenny Bruce

References

External links 
 Twitter
 

1983 births
Television producers from California
Living people
People from Los Angeles
University of California, Riverside alumni
University of California, Los Angeles alumni